

Numerical values 
For each atom, the column marked 1 is the first ionization energy to ionize the neutral atom, the column marked 2 is the second ionization energy to remove a second electron from the +1 ion, the column marked 3 is the third ionization energy to remove a third electron from the +2 ion, and so on.

"use" and "WEL" give ionization energy in the unit kJ/mol; "CRC" gives atomic ionization energy in the unit eV.

Notes 

 Values from CRC are ionization energies given in the unit eV; other values are molar ionization energies given in the unit kJ/mol. The first of these quantities is used in atomic physics, the second in chemistry, but both refer to the same basic property of the element. To convert from "value of ionization energy" to the corresponding "value of molar ionization energy", the conversion is:
1 eV = 96.48534 kJ/mol
1 kJ/mol = 0.0103642688 eV

References

WEL 
As quoted at http://www.webelements.com/ from these sources:
 J.E. Huheey, E.A. Keiter, and R.L. Keiter in Inorganic Chemistry : Principles of Structure and Reactivity, 4th edition, HarperCollins, New York, USA, 1993.
 A.M. James and M.P. Lord in Macmillan's Chemical and Physical Data, Macmillan, London, UK, 1992.

External links 

 NIST Atomic Spectra Database Ionization Energies

See also 
Molar ionization energies of the elements

Properties of chemical elements
Chemical element data pages